South West Petrel Island is an island game reserve with an area of 4 ha, part of the Petrel Island Group, lying in Bass Strait close to Walker and Robbins Islands in north-west Tasmania, Australia.

Fauna
Recorded breeding seabird, shorebird and waterbird species include little penguin, short-tailed shearwater, common diving-petrel, white-faced storm-petrel, Pacific gull, silver gull, sooty oystercatcher and Cape Barren goose.

References

Islands of North West Tasmania